Chanel Modiri Mokango (born October 13, 1988) is a Congolese professional basketball playing for Dexia Namur in Belgium and the Tulsa Shock in the WNBA.  She was selected 9th in the 2010 WNBA draft by the Atlanta Dream and spent a portion of the 2010 WNBA season playing for the Los Angeles Sparks.  At the collegiate level she was a stand out player for the Mississippi State Bulldogs helping to lead that team to the second round of the NCAA Division I tournament in 2009 and the third round (sweet 16) in 2010.

Mississippi State statistics

Source

References

External links
 Player profile
 Mossissippi State bio

1988 births
Living people
Atlanta Dream draft picks
Democratic Republic of the Congo women's basketball players
Los Angeles Sparks players
Mississippi State Bulldogs women's basketball players
Power forwards (basketball)
Southeastern Illinois Falcons women's basketball players
Basketball players from Kinshasa
21st-century Democratic Republic of the Congo people